Jay Accorsi (born October 1, 1963) is an American college football head coach at Rowan University, an NCAA Division III program in Glassboro, New Jersey. He began coaching at Rowan in 2002, and in his first season he led the Profs to a New Jersey Athletic Conference (NJAC) championship, which was their second in a row. He has guided them to seven outright or tied NJAC championships in all. In 2010, Rowan was the co-champion with Montclair State, but due to a tiebreaker they did not qualify for the postseason. In 2013, Rowan received the playoff bid because of their tiebreaker over SUNY Brockport.

He played for Nichols.

He is a member of the South Jersey branch of the National Football Foundation. His son, Jack , is a soccer player.

Head coaching record

References

External links
 Rowan profile

1963 births
Living people
American football running backs
Nichols Bison baseball coaches
Nichols Bison football coaches
Nichols Bison football players
Rowan Profs football coaches
Rowan University alumni
People from Tolland County, Connecticut
Coaches of American football from Connecticut
Players of American football from Connecticut